The Spanish Peaks, avg el. , is a mountain range between Bozeman, Montana and Ennis, Montana in Gallatin and Madison County, Montana.  It is a sub-range of the much larger Madison Range, itself a sub-range of the Rocky Mountains.  The hydrological divide of the range serves as the border between Gallatin and Madison County, Montana. The Spanish Peaks are made up of 1.6 billion year-old gneiss, making them the oldest peaks in the Madison Range, predating the rest of the range by 50-60 million years. Gallatin Peak, el. 11,015 ft., is the highest peak in the group.

See also
 List of mountain ranges in Montana

Notes

External links
Gallatin Peak at summitpost.org
Madison Range at summitpost.org

Mountain ranges of Montana
Landforms of Madison County, Montana
Landforms of Gallatin County, Montana